The Moldovan records in swimming are the fastest ever performances of swimmers from Moldova, which are recognised and ratified by the Moldovan Swimming Federation.

All records were set in finals unless noted otherwise.

Long Course (50 m)

Men

Women

Mixed relay

Short Course (25 m)

Men

Women

Mixed relay

References
General
Moldovan Long Course records 5 January 2018 updated
Moldovan Short Course records 23 June 2018 updated
Specific

External links
FISN web site

Moldova
Records
Swimming
Swimming